Shakti with John McLaughlin is the first album by Shakti, described as "another brain blowing achievement" by Agha Yasir .

Track listing 
Side one
"Joy" (John McLaughlin/L. Shankar) – 18:13
"Lotus Feet" (McLaughlin) – 4:44
Side two
"What Need Have I for This–What Need Have I for That–I Am Dancing at the Feet of My Lord–All Is Bliss–All Is Bliss" (McLaughlin/Shankar) - 29:03

Personnel
 John McLaughlin - Guitar
 L. Shankar - Violin
 Ramnad Raghavan - Mridangam
 T. H. Vinayakaram - Ghatam and Mridangam
 Zakir Hussain - Tabla

Personnel - Production (Record)

 John McLaughlin - Producer
 Nathan Weiss - Manager
 Joseph D'Anna - Engineer
 Stan Tonkel - Engineer
 Apeksha Bacciagallupi
 Pranavanada - Photos
 Gregory diGiovine - CBS Records
 Danny Wong - Lettering
 Marie de Oro - Design

Personnel - Production (CD)

 Mike Berniker - Producer, Coordination
 Larry Keyes - Digital Remastering
 Gary Pacheco - Coordination
 Penny Armstrong - Coordination
 Tony Tiller - Package Coordination
 Pete Cenedella - Package Coordination

Chart performance

References

1976 live albums
Shakti (band) albums
Columbia Records live albums
1976 debut albums